The Canadian Union of Skilled Workers (CUSW) is a blended skilled trades union based in Canada. It was founded in February 1999 and was a former local (Local 1788) of the International Brotherhood of Electrical Workers, which then represented Ontario employees of Ontario Hydro. It is affiliated with the Confederation of Canadian Unions.

References

External links
 CUSW website
 CUSW Constitution
Trade unions in Canada
1999 establishments in Ontario
Trade unions established in 1999
Confederation of Canadian Unions
Breakaway trade unions